Isohyaenodon ("equal to Hyaenodon") is an extinct polyphyletic genus of hyainailourid hyaenodont mammal from polyphyletic subtribe Isohyaenodontina (of the polyphyletic tribe Hyainailourini within paraphyletic subfamily Hyainailourinae). Remains are known from early to middle Miocene deposits in Kenya, East Africa.

Description
Isohyaenodon is distinguished from Hyaenodon in having more robust molars, lower molars with a subequal paraconid and protoconid, and upper molars with a more well-developed protocone.

Classification and phylogeny

Taxonomy
Isohyaenodon was considered possibly the same genus as Leakitherium from the same region by Van Valen (1967), but subsequent studies have rejected this assumption.

Isohyaenodon pilgrimi Savage, 1965 was formerly assigned to this genus, but has been renamed Exiguodon pilgrimi.

Phylogeny
The phylogenetic relationships of genus Isohyaenodon are shown in the following cladogram:

See also
 Mammal classification
 Hyainailourini

References

Hyaenodonts
Miocene mammals of Africa
Prehistoric placental genera